Franchet d'Esperey station is a French railway station in the city of Reims, Marne department, northern France. The station is located in the Courlancy and Croix Rouge neighbourhoods of the city. It is situated at kilometric point (KP) 169.700 on the Épernay-Reims railway and served by TER Grand Est trains operated by the SNCF.

History 
The station is named after Marshal Louis Franchet d'Espèrey and is in the proximity of a school named after him.

In 2018, the SNCF estimated that 53,799 passengers transited through the station.

References 

Railway stations in Marne (department)
Transport in Reims
Buildings and structures in Reims
Railway stations in France opened in 2009